Anahad O'Connor (born 23 May 1981) is an American journalist and staff reporter for The New York Times. He joined the Times in 2003 and writes about consumer health, science and national issues. He is also a bestselling author. 

O'Connor was born and grew up on the Lower East Side of Manhattan. He studied neuroscience and has a degree in psychology from Yale University. His book The 10 Things You Need to Eat made The New York Times Bestseller list in 2010. He was part of the first class of the New York Times College Scholarship Program in 1999.

Bibliography
 Lose It!: The Personalized Weight Loss Revolution (2010)
 The 10 Things You Need to Eat: And More Than 100 Easy and Delicious Ways to Prepare Them (2009)
 Always Follow the Elephants: More Surprising Facts and Misleading Myths About Our Health and the World We Live In (2009)
 Never Shower in a Thunderstorm: Surprising Facts and Misleading Myths About Our Health and the World We Live In (2007)

References

1981 births
Living people
21st-century American journalists
21st-century American male writers
21st-century American non-fiction writers
American health and wellness writers
American male journalists
American male non-fiction writers
Diet food advocates
People from the Lower East Side
The New York Times writers
Yale College alumni